Camp Point is a village in Adams County, Illinois, United States. The population was 1,121 at the 2020 census, down from 1,132 at the 2010 census. It is part of the Quincy, IL–MO Micropolitan Statistical Area.

Geography
Camp Point is located at  (40.041676, -91.065136).

History
Camp Point was founded in 1835 by Peter Garrett and was originally called Garrett's Mills. A school house was built here in 1836. Then a family named the Farlow started to build the town more.

Demographics

As of the 2020 census there were 1,121 people, 420 households, and 267 families residing in the village. The racial makeup of the village was 94.20% White, 0.27% African American, 0.18% Native American, 0.45% Asian, 0.71% from other races, and 4.19% from two or more races. Hispanic or Latino of any race were 1.61% of the population.

There were 420 households, out of which 80.95% had children under the age of 18 living with them, 49.29% were married couples living together, 7.14% had a female householder with no husband present, and 36.43% were non-families. 31.67% of all households were made up of individuals, and 10.71% had someone living alone who was 65 years of age or older. The average household size was 3.34 and the average family size was 2.57.

The village's age distribution consisted of 30.5% under the age of 18, 4.9% from 18 to 24, 24.1% from 25 to 44, 21.8% from 45 to 64, and 18.9% who were 65 years of age or older. The median age was 36.6 years. For every 100 females, there were 90.0 males. For every 100 females age 18 and over, there were 78.3 males.

The median income for a household in the village was $52,794, and the median income for a family was $64,821. Males had a median income of $41,065 versus $26,343 for females. The per capita income for the village was $23,555. About 3.7% of families and 5.9% of the population were below the poverty line, including 5.2% of those under age 18 and 13.2% of those age 65 or over.

Registered Historic Places
F. D. Thomas House

Notable people 

 Allan Nevins (1890-1971), journalist and historian; born in Camp Point
 Arthur S. Nevins (1891 - 1979), brigadier general in the United States Army, close friend of Dwight D. Eisenhower and manager of the Eisenhowers' Gettysburg Farm; brother of Allan Nevins.
 Rick Reuschel, Major league All-Star pitcher, won 214 career games
 Elizabeth Stanley, actress
 Pinch Thomas (1888-1953), catcher for the Boston Red Sox and Cleveland Indians; born in Camp Point

References

External links
 Camp Point blog
 History of Camp Point

Villages in Adams County, Illinois
Quincy, Illinois micropolitan area
Villages in Illinois
1835 establishments in Illinois